Sainte-Rose-de-Lima may refer to:

 Rose of Lima, a Catholic saint

Places 
 Sainte-Rose, Quebec, a district in Laval, Quebec
 Sainte-Rose-de-Lima, French Guiana, a Lokono village in French Guiana